Ronald "Ron" Brewster (born 2 April 1976 in St Andrews, Fife, Scotland) is a Scottish male curler and curling coach.

Teams

Men's

Mixed

Record as a coach of national teams

Private life
Ronald is from curlers family: his older brother Tom Brewster is well-known curler, 2014 Winter Olympics silver medallist.

References

External links
 
 

Living people
1976 births
Sportspeople from St Andrews
Scottish male curlers
European curling champions
Scottish curling champions
Scottish curling coaches